The Secret Daughter Season Two: Songs from the Original 7 Series is the second individual soundtrack album by Australian recording artist Jessica Mauboy, featuring music used in the second season of the television series of the same name, which stars Mauboy. The album was released on 6 October 2017 through Sony Music Australia.

At the ARIA Music Awards of 2018, the album was nominated for Best Original Soundtrack, Cast or Show Album.

Singles
The original track "Fallin' " was released as the album's lead single on 9 June 2017; it peaked at number 11 on the ARIA Singles Chart and was certified platinum for shipments of 70,000 units. Another original track "Then I Met You" was released on 17 September 2017 as the album's second single; it peaked at number 114 on the ARIA Singles Chart.

Reception

David from auspOp said "First and foremost, there are far too many covers here" calling the album "a mixed bag." He said "Nothing new has been done to most of the tracks – most versions are competent but not innovative or particularly memorable" but praised "Amazing Grace". David said of the two originals; "Fallin'" is "a stunningly beautiful song" and "Then I Met You" "is Jess at her mid-tempo belter best."

Cameron Adams from Herald Sun said "Mauboy shines up The Church's haunting 'Under the Milky Way', Paul Kelly's 'Dumb Things' is solid pub rock karaoke. Mauboy fought for Goanna's 'Solid Rock' and it shows. The real joy here is 'Amazing Grace', sung in native tongue, with Dr G Yunupingu [...] As new original 'Fallin' ' demonstrates that's enough covers albums now, time for new material."

Track listing

Charts

Weekly charts

Year-end charts

Certifications

Release history

See also
 List of top 25 albums for 2017 in Australia

References

Jessica Mauboy albums
2017 soundtrack albums
Sony Music Australia albums
Soundtracks by Australian artists